Melampsoraceae are a family of rust fungi in the order Pucciniales. The family is monotypic, containing the single genus Melampsora, which contains about 90 species.

References

Pucciniales
Basidiomycota families
Monogeneric fungus families